The Aristophyli were a tribe of the district of Paropamisus, in Bactria. near the Karakorum Ranges during the Classical era.

History
During the Hellenistic and Persian Empires the Arstophyli  lived in the satrapy of the Paropanisadai.

They are mentioned in Claudius Ptolemaeus and appear on a map of that work, in the area north west of modern Kabul.

They came under the rule of Demetrius I of Bactria, who was ruling Greek Bactria from Kupisa. until Eucratides I of the Indo-Greek Kingdom conquered the area.

References 

Ancient history of Afghanistan
Iranian nomads
Iron Age peoples of Asia